"The Garden of Allah" is a song by Don Henley, released as new material on his 1995 album Actual Miles: Henley's Greatest Hits.

It is presented as a modern-day fable in which the Devil discovers he has become obsolete. Background vocals were provided by Sheryl Crow. Actor Kirk Douglas appeared as the Devil in the music video.

References

Don Henley songs
1995 singles
1995 songs
Songs written by Don Henley
Songs written by Stan Lynch

Music videos directed by Jake Scott (director)